Orion was a  74-gun ship of the line of the French Navy.

Career 
Orion was commissioned in 1814 under Captain Jean-Baptiste Billard.

In 1827, Orion was chosen as a school ship of the École navale. She was replaced by Borda in 1840, and struck in 1841.

Notes, citations, and references

Notes

Citations

References
 

Ships of the line of the French Navy
Téméraire-class ships of the line
1813 ships